Wehner is a surname. Notable people with the surname include:
 David Wehner, CFO of Facebook
 Herbert Wehner (1906–1990), German politician; served in the Bundestag 1949–83
 John Wehner (born 1967), American professional baseball player and sports broadcaster
 Josef Magnus Wehner (1891–1973), German author and playwright
 Joseph Frank Wehner (1895–1918), American fighter pilot in World War I
 Stephanie Wehner, German physicist

References 

German-language surnames
Occupational surnames